Rodondo Roach (born 27 October 2002) is an Anguillan association footballer who currently plays for Diamond FC of the AFA Senior Male League, and the Anguilla national team.

Club career
Roach began playing competitive football in 2015. In 2018 he won Anguilla's local Flow Skills Competition and was the island's male representative in the final competition held in Port of Spain, Trinidad and Tobago that year. In October 2019 Roach and fellow Anguillan Raymel Niles joined the under-19 team of 1. FCA Darmstadt of the German seventh division on loan from Diamond FC. The short-term loan ended in December 2019 and the two players arrived home ahead of the 2020 AFA Senior Male League.

International career
In 2019 Roach made one appearance for Anguilla in 2019 CONCACAF U-17 Championship qualifying. He made his senior international debut on 5 June 2021 in a 2022 FIFA World Cup qualification match against Panama.

International career statistics

References

External links

Anguillan footballers
Anguilla international footballers
Association football defenders
2002 births
Living people
Diamond FC players
People from The Valley, Anguilla